The Whirlpool sign also known as the Whirl sign is related to mesentery when the bowel rotates around the mesentery causing a swirling appearance of the mesentery around the mesenteric vessels.

It can also be related to ovaries when twisting of the vascular pedicle of the ovaries takes place.

References

Radiologic signs